You Are So Beautiful is a compilation album by American country music singer Tanya Tucker. It was released in June 1977 by Columbia Records and with producer Billy Sherrill. It consisted of songs Tucker had recorded several years prior while still recording for Columbia.  The highest-charting single was "Spring," which rose to #18 on the Billboard C&W chart in 1975, two years before the album's release, that single having been released by Columbia to compete with Tucker's debut MCA single, the #1 C&W hit "Lizzie and the Rainman".  At the time the You Are So Beautiful album was released, Tucker's rendition of the title track was issued as a single reaching #40 C&W; the album was Tucker's lowest ranking up to that point at #44 on the C&W Albums chart.

Track listing

1977 albums
Tanya Tucker albums
Albums produced by Billy Sherrill
Columbia Records albums